Lepiselaga crassipes is a species of horse flies in the family Tabanidae.

References

Tabanidae
Diptera of South America
Diptera of North America
Insects described in 1805
Taxa named by Johan Christian Fabricius